Tomasz Nowak (30 August 1960 – 1 August 2013) was a Polish boxer. He competed in the men's featherweight event at the 1988 Summer Olympics.

References

1960 births
2013 deaths
Polish male boxers
Olympic boxers of Poland
Boxers at the 1988 Summer Olympics
Boxers from Warsaw
AIBA World Boxing Championships medalists
Featherweight boxers
21st-century Polish people
20th-century Polish people